Marrero may refer to:

 Marrero (surname)
 Marrero, Louisiana, a census-designated place in the United States
 Estadio Pedro Marrero, a multi-purpose stadium in Havana, Cuba